The Croatia–Italy football rivalry, also known as Adriatic Derby (Italian: Derby Adriatico), is a football rivalry between the national football teams of Croatia and Italy. The two nations are separated by the Adriatic Sea, from which the sporting rivalry derives its name. Both national sides are governed by UEFA in Europe, in addition to FIFA during their international matches. Croatia has never lost against Italy, with most of the fixtures between the two nations played during qualifications and in tournaments.

History 
The two sides first competed against each other in the qualifying of Euro 1996, where Croatia prevailed 2–1. Their next match during the qualifiers resulted in their first draw, 1–1. They drew again during a goalless international friendly in Zagreb. Croatia and Italy met for their first FIFA World Cup in 2002, in group stage, where the Croatians prevailed 2–1. During the match, Italy took the lead in 55th minute after Christian Vieri scored, but Croatia made a comeback by goals from Ivica Olić in 73rd and Milan Rapaić in 76th minute. Two Italian goals were disallowed during the game. Italy finished second in the group with a point more than Croatia and thus entered knockout stage where they were eliminated by South Korea. In 2006, Croatia beat Italy 2–0 in their second international friendly in Livorno. The two sides drew 1–1 in the qualifying for Euro 2012. 

They resumed competition during the qualifying for Euro 2016; Croatia and Italy played each other twice, drawing both times. The first match was marred by crowd trouble due to flares being thrown onto the pitch. During game-play, Andrea Pirlo scored a free kick in the 39th minute to give Italy the lead. Mario Mandžukić scored the equalizer for Croatia in the 72nd minute. Italy finished second in Group C with 5 points, one more than third place Croatia.

List of matches

Top scorers 

  Davor Šuker (3 goals)
  Antonio Candreva (2 goals)
  Mario Mandžukić (2 goals)

Statistics

Overall

See also 

 Italians of Croatia
 Croatia–Italy relations
 Italian language in Croatia 
 Croatia–Serbia football rivalry
 France–Italy football rivalry

Notes

References

International association football rivalries
Croatia national football team rivalries
Italy national football team rivalries
football